Iranian wrestling or Koshti is a form of submission grappling that has been practiced since ancient times in Iran. A form today is koshti pahlavani practiced in the zurkhaneh. while regional variations differ from one province to another. Olympic freestyle wrestling is often referred to as the "first sport" of Iran.

Iran has won 47 Olympic medals for wrestling.

History 
Wrestling in Iran, like weightlifting, can be traced to the ancient Persian sport of  Varzesh-e-Bastani, which translates to "ancient sport." Traditionally the sport was seen as a way to promote "inner strength through outer strength." Those involved were meant to embody kindness and humility, while defending the society from "sinfulness."

This practice has survived into the modern era through various attempts to downplay the pre-Islamic roots of the country. It made the transition from the Pahlavi shah's efforts to modernise the country and through the transition of the 1979 Revolution.

Interactions with the U.S. 
After the election of Mohammad Khatami as president in 1997, he considered wrestling as a possible way to reopen diplomatic relations between Iran and U.S, after nearly two decades. This was an Iranian take on Nixon-era "ping pong" diplomacy with China.

In Feb. 2017 Iran planned on denying visas to U.S. wrestlers for the Freestyle World Cup. This was done in response to President Trump's travel ban to seven Muslim majority countries. The decision to bar U.S. participants was eventually overturned by Iranian officials after a U.S. federal judge temporarily blocked Trump's ban on Iranians traveling to the U.S.

Professional Wrestling 
One professional wrestling promotion that operates in Iran is the Iran Wrestling Group (IWG). The promotion was founded in 2009. They have run shows including "IWG First War" and "IWG Lord of the Ring."

Professional wrestler Hossein Khosrow Ali Vaziri was born in Tehran, Iran March 14, 1942. He has wrestled globally under the name The Iron Sheik.

Notable styles of Iranian wrestling 
Wrestling is the first sport in Iran and Iranians have the highest Olympic medal for wrestling. in Iran two notable styles are for wrestling:
 Koshti Pahlavani, literally "heroic wrestling" (practiced throughout Iran)
Tourkamani style or Kurash (Golestan Province)

See also
 Iranian Premier Wrestling League
 Indian clubs
 Köräş
 Pahlavani
 Pankration
 Pehlwani
 Sambo
 Yağlı güreş

References

External links
 Documentary video of Iranian wrestling conditioning
 Iran Wrestling parstimes.com
 Amateur Wrestling Federation of the I.R. Iran

 
Iran
Traditional sports of Iran

mzn:لوچو